The 2020 Asian Wrestling Championships was held at the KD Jadhav Indoor Stadium, Indira Gandhi Arena, New Delhi in India. The event took place from 18 to 23 February. China was barred from entering into the competition due to the COVID-19 pandemic. North Korea and Turkmenistan were unable to participate in the tournament due to circumstances stemming from the outbreak.

Medal table

Team ranking

Medal summary

Men's freestyle

Men's Greco-Roman

Women's freestyle

Participating nations 
274 competitors from 23 nations competed.

 (2)
 (6)
 (30)
 (20)
 (11)
 (30)
 (2)
 (30)
 (2)
 (24)
 (21)
 (4)
 (1)
 (1)
 (2)
 (3)
 (22)
 (2)
 (15)
 (9)
 (30)
 (5)
 (2)

References

External links
UWW Official Website
Results Book

Asia
Asian Wrestling Championships
Wrestling
International wrestling competitions hosted by India
Sports competitions in Delhi
Asian Wrestling Championships